Half-caste are people of mixed ethnicity.

Half Caste may also refer to:
Half Caste (horse), the winner of the 1859 Grand National Steeplechase 
"Half Caste" (poem), a poem by John Agard
Half-Caste (film), a 2004 horror film